The Australia cricket team toured South Africa, playing three Test matches and a three-match Twenty20 series against the South African national team from 12 February to 14 March 2014. On 3 March 2014, South African captain Graeme Smith announced that he would retire from international cricket after the third Test. Australia won the Test series 2–1 and the T20 series 2–0. Australian captain Michael Clarke scored 161 not out in the third Test playing with a fractured shoulder.

Squads

Test series

1st Test

2nd Test

3rd Test

T20I series

1st T20I

2nd T20I

3rd T20I

Statistics
Australia
 David Warner passed 2,000 Test runs in the second innings of the 1st Test.
 Brad Haddin passed 3,000 Test runs in the second innings of the 2nd Test.
 Chris Rogers passed 1,000 Test runs in the second innings of the 3rd Test.
 Ryan Harris took his 100th Test wicket in the fourth innings of the 3rd Test.

South Africa
Hashim Amla passed 6,000 Test runs in the second innings of the 1st Test.
AB de Villiers passed 7,000 Test runs in the first innings of the 2nd Test.
Jean-Paul Duminy passed 1,000 Test runs in the first innings of the 2nd Test.

References

External links
 Series page on Wisden India

Australian cricket tours of South Africa
International cricket competitions in 2013–14
2013–14 South African cricket season
2014 in Australian cricket
2014 in South African cricket